Jitendra Banerjee (9 August 1905 – 18 January 1984) was an Indian cricketer. He played thirteen first-class matches for Bengal between 1934 and 1940.

See also
 List of Bengal cricketers

References

External links
 

1905 births
1984 deaths
Indian cricketers
Bengal cricketers
Cricketers from Kolkata